John Benjamin Hickey (born June 25, 1963) is an American actor with a career in stage, film and television. He won the 2011 Tony Award for Best Performance by a Featured Actor in a Play for his performance as Felix Turner in The Normal Heart.

Early life
Hickey was born in Plano, Texas, and graduated from Plano Sr. High School in 1981. He attended Texas State University - San Marcos from 1981–1983, where he was active in the theater department. He earned his bachelor's degree in English at Fordham University in 1985.

Career
On Broadway, he originated the role of Arthur in Terrence McNally's play Love! Valour! Compassion! in 1995, a role he recreated for the 1997 film version.

He played supporting roles in a number of films including The Ice Storm (1997) and The Anniversary Party (2001). He has also appeared in Flightplan, Flags of Our Fathers, Freedom Writers, Then She Found Me, Transformers: Revenge of the Fallen, The Bet and Life with Judy Garland: Me and My Shadows.

He played Clifford Bradshaw in the 1998 Broadway revival of Cabaret, which won the Tony for Best Revival of a Musical. In that same year, he played the lead in the independent film Finding North.

On Broadway, he played Reverend John Hale in the 2002 revival of Arthur Miller's The Crucible.

Hickey played American novelist and playwright Jack Dunphy in the 2006 Truman Capote biopic Infamous. Hickey played Philip Stoddard on the short-lived gay-themed sitcom It's All Relative. Since It's All Relative, Hickey has appeared on Alias, Law & Order, Brothers & Sisters, Stacked, Heartland, In Plain Sight, Law & Order: Los Angeles, and Modern Family.

He appeared in the 2011 Broadway revival of The Normal Heart, for which he won the Tony Award, Featured Actor in a Play. He was in the Broadway revival of Mary Stuart in 2009, as the Earl of Leicester.

From 2010 to 2013, he appeared on The Big C and was nominated for a Primetime Emmy Award for Outstanding Supporting Actor in a Miniseries or a Movie for the final season of the series, subtitled Hereafter. Hickey starred as scientist Frank Winter on the TV series Manhattan, which concluded on December 15, 2015 after two seasons and 23 episodes.

In 2015, he appeared Off-Broadway at the Mitzi Newhouse Theatre in the play Dada Woof Papa Hot by Peter Parnell.

In 2018 he appeared in the world premiere of Matthew Lopez's new play The Inheritance, inspired by E.M. Forster's novel Howards End, creating the role Henry Wilcox at London's Young Vic and then transferring to the West End.

On September 30, 2021, Hickey was cast as Father Callahan in the adaptation of Stephen King's Salem's Lot for Warner Bros. Pictures and New Line Cinema.

Personal life
Hickey is gay. Since 2003 his partner has been screenwriter and television producer Jeffrey Richman.

Filmography

Film
Source: TCM; AllMovie

Television

Theatre
Source: IBDB, IOBDB

Awards and nominations

References

External links

 
 
 

1963 births
Male actors from Texas
American male film actors
American male stage actors
American male television actors
American gay actors
Juilliard School alumni
Living people
People from Plano, Texas
20th-century American male actors
21st-century American male actors
Fordham University alumni
Texas State University alumni
Tony Award winners
LGBT people from Texas
Audiobook narrators